Danger Tomorrow is a 1960 British noir crime film directed by Terry Bishop and starring Zena Walker, Robert Urquhart and Rupert Davies.

Plot
A doctor and his wife move into an old house in an English village where he is to start a new job, but over the next few days his wife (who has second sight) begins to experience strange visions, in which she foresees a murder, and starts feeling frightened that her life is in danger.

Cast
 Zena Walker - Ginny Murray
 Robert Urquhart - Bob Murray
 Rupert Davies - Dr. Robert Campbell
 Annabel Maule - Helen
 Russell Waters - Steve
 Lisa Daniely - Marie
 Maggie Flint - Florist
 Charles Houston - Messenger
 Dennis Warden - Johnson
 Robert Dougall - News reader
 Neil Hallett - Police Inspector
 Kenneth J. Warren - Patient

References

External links

Danger Tomorrow trailer  British Film Network on Facebook

1960 films
1960 crime films
British crime films
1960s English-language films
Films directed by Terry Bishop
1960s British films